John or Jack Meredith may refer to:

 John A. Meredith (1814–1882), American politician and judge from Virginia
 John Meredith (rugby union) (1863–1920), Welsh international rugby union player
 John Meredith (general) (1864–1942), Australian Army brigadier-general in World War I
 John Meredith (baseball), American baseball player
 Jack Meredith (footballer) (1899–1970), English footballer
 John Meredith (folklorist) (1920–2001), Australian folklorist
 John Meredith (artist) (1933–2000), Canadian painter
 John Meredith (footballer) (born 1940), English former professional footballer
 John Meredith (real estate) (1966–), American real estate technology entrepreneur and filmmaker

See also
 John Meredith Temple (1910–1994), British Conservative MP
 Jack Meredith (disambiguation)